Artur de Oliveira was a Brazilian writer, teacher and poet. He was born in Porto Alegre on August 11, 1851, and died in Rio de Janeiro, RJ, on August 21, 1882. He was the patron of chair no. 3 at the Brazilian Academy of Letters, by choice of Filinto de Almeida.

He was the son of João Domingos de Oliveira and Maria Angélica de Oliveira. After primary school in his hometown, he arrived in Rio de Janeiro at the age of 16, at the end of 1867. From Rio de Janeiro he traveled to Minas Gerais, in order to enroll in the famous Caraça school. Leaving the school of his own free will, but with an accusation of indiscipline, he went to Pernambuco, where he tried to study at the Faculty of Law of Recife, in 1870, but, failing mathematics, he gave up trying again.

He then went to Europe. On August 4, 1870, he wrote to his father describing his first observations of Paris, including the Franco-Prussian War, which was almost over then. From Paris he traveled to Berlin, however, returning to France in the first days of November 1871, expelled by the German authorities, remaining in Paris at least until May 1872. He maintained friendly relations with Théophile Gautier and his sister Judith, Catulle Mendès, Leconte de Lisle and the famous bookseller Alphonse Lemerre. By 1873, he had returned in Rio de Janeiro, after a long and fruitless attempt to obtain a law degree, which seems to have been much more his father's aspiration than his own. In 1879, he ran for the position of substitute professor of Rhetoric, National Poetics and Literature at Colégio Pedro II. Failing that, he submitted himself to another competition the following year, at the same College, again an unsuccessful attempt. Later, he was appointed as a substitute teacher of Portuguese and Literary History at that school and also taught at the Escola Normal.

His intensive reading, his studies at Caraça and his trip through Europe fed his well-known erudition, which he liked to exhibit, with talent and a lively imagination, reading poetry to his friends, including Fontoura Xavier, Teófilo Dias, Carvalho Júnior and Alberto de Oliveira. The latter, in an interview with Terra Roxa e Outras Terras, in 1926, testifies to the importance of Artur de Oliveira in the introduction of Parnassianism in Brazil: "Arthur read Gautier, Banville, Sully-Prudhomme, Baudelaire and excited us with his enthusiasm." But in fact, he talked more than he wrote. His literary production is scarce and, even so, does not correspond to what is expected from the genius proclaimed by those who lived with him. His death, at the age of 31, was deeply felt for having erased one of the great talents of his generation.

With an insignificant bibliography while he lived - about one hundred printed pages - Artur de Oliveira only had one more significant edition of his work, in 1936. Luís Filipe Vieira Souto collected all his works under the title of Dispersos, including his family correspondence, which is regarded by some as much more important and valuable than all of his known writings.

References

Brazilian writers
1851 births
1882 deaths
Brazilian poets